ʻAbd al-Ẓāhir (ALA-LC romanization of ) literally, "servant (or slave) of the Evident (Outer)," "evident" or "outer" being a reference to Allah, is the name of:

Abdul Zahir (politician) (1910 - 1983), Prime Minister of Afghanistan 1971-1972
Abdul Zahir (Guantanamo detainee 753) (born 1972), Afghan, tenth Guantanamo captive to face charges
Abdel-Zaher El-Saqua (born 1974), Egyptian footballer
Abdul Zahir (Konar Education Minister), Education Minister for Konar Province, Afghanistan, 2008

Arabic masculine given names